Carbonea vitellaria is a species of lichenicolous fungus belonging to the family Lecanoraceae. It has a worldwide distribution. In Iceland it has been reported growing on Candelariella vitellina near Egilsstaðir and on King George Island, Antarctica.

References

Lecanoraceae
Fungi described in 1852
Fungi of Iceland
Taxa named by William Nylander (botanist)
Lichenicolous fungi